Hitzum is a village in Waadhoeke municipality in the province of Friesland, the Netherlands. It had a population of around 225 in January 2014. Before 2018, the village was part of the Franekeradeel municipality.

The village was first mentioned in the 13th century as Hitsem, and means "settlement of the people of Hitse (person)". Hitzum is a terp (artificial living hill) village. Archaeological artefacts have been discovered in the village from the 6th century. The  family originated from Hitzum. The Dutch Reformed church dates from 1883.

Hitzum was home to 98 people in 1840. In 1971, a village house was built in Hitzum.

Gallery

References

External links

Waadhoeke
Populated places in Friesland